The Type 401 Rhein-class tender was a class of tender ships which was laid down in 1958, christened in 1959 and put into service in 1961 and served as a support unit for the 3rd Schnellboot Squadron until they were decommissioned by 1992. A total of eight ships of this class were built, in addition to the ships Rhine, the Elbe, Main, Neckar, Ruhr, Weser, Werra and Danube.

Development 
Tenders are used as supply and command ships and to supply combat units (FACs, anti-mine ships, submarines) with everything they need at sea. Long endurance at sea are only possible with these mother ships. The tenders take care of the supply of fuel, water and provisions, they also provide workshops, spare parts and tools as well as an infirmary with an operating theater for crews.

After decommissioning, four of the ships were scrapped, three sold to Turkey and one to Greece.

The Type 402 Mosel-class tender consists of three ships (Mosel, Isar, Saar) which are used to supply minesweepers.

The Type 403 Lahn-class tender are used to supply submarines with two ships of this subclass, Lahn and Lech.

Depending on the purpose (FAC or minesweeper tender), different drive concepts were used (diesel-electric drive or diesel engines).

Ships of class

Citations

Auxiliary transport ship classes
Auxiliary ships of Germany
Auxiliary ships of the German Navy
Ships of the Turkish Navy